Truteau is a surname from France.

People with this name include:

 Étienne Truteau (1642–1712), early settler to Longueuil, District of Montreal, Colony of Canada, New France, North America; what is now Longueuil, Quebec, Canada; founder of the Truteau and Trudeau family lineages of North America, including the Canadian political Trudeau family.
 Élisabeth Truteau (18th c.), mother of Superior General of the Congregation of Notre Dame Marie-Victoire Baudry (1782–1846)
 Flavia Truteau (19th c.), mother of Canadian feminist Caroline Dessaulles-Béique (1852–1946)
  (1748–1827; also Jean Trudeau), an explorer of the Missouri Company, founding outposts on the Missouri, the Nebraska, and the Niobrara rivers.
 Robert Truteau (1544–1589), earliest known ancestor of the North American Trudeau/Truteau familial lineage, including Étienne Truteau and the Canadian political Trudeau family

See also

 Trudeau (surname)